Pollyanna McIntosh (born 15 March 1979) is a Scottish American actress and director known for her roles in films Exam (2009), The Woman (2011), Let Us Prey (2014), the first season of Joe R. Lansdale's Hap and Leonard (2016), a starring role in The Walking Dead (2017–2018) and The Walking Dead: World Beyond (2021), and social issue horror film Darlin' (2019) which she wrote, directed and starred in. McIntosh also portrays Queen Ælfgifu of Denmark in the Netflix series Vikings: Valhalla (2022).

Biography
Pollyanna McIntosh was born in Dunbartonshire, Scotland. From ages two to five, she and her family lived in Portugal. They then lived in Edinburgh before moving to Colombia. Her father was an actor, but he became a businessman working for a thread company so that he could spend more time with his family. McIntosh attended St. George's School for Girls.

McIntosh debuted as an actress aged 16, appearing in London's independent film and theatre as both an actress and director. In 2004 she moved to Los Angeles and directed the stage production The Woolgatherer with Anne Dudek and Dyan David Fisher. In 2005, she received her first film role in Headspace. In 2009 she starred in Exam and was nominated for both Best Work of a Rookie at the BAFTA Awards and the Raindance Award at the British Independent Film Awards. In 2011, she was cast in the film The Woman for which she was nominated for Best Actress at the Fangoria Chainsaw Awards. In 2016 she was cast as Angel in the SundanceTV series Hap and Leonard and was cast the following year as Jadis ("Anne") in a starring role on The Walking Dead.
Her debut feature as a script writer and director, the social issue horror film Darlin', premiered at the South-by-Southwest festival in Austin, Texas in March 2019.

McIntosh also pursues a career in fashion and works in support of young people's charity the Joshua Nolan Foundation.

She was married to actor Grant Show from 2004 to 2011.

Filmography

Film

Television

Video games

References

External links
 

21st-century Scottish actresses
Living people
Scottish stage actresses
Scottish video game actresses
20th-century Scottish actresses
People educated at Boroughmuir High School
People educated at St George's School, Edinburgh
1979 births